Spring Street in Los Angeles is one of the oldest streets in the city. Along Spring Street in Downtown Los Angeles, from just north of Fourth Street to just south of Seventh Street is the NRHP-listed Spring Street Financial District, nicknamed Wall Street of the West, lined with Beaux Arts buildings and currently experiencing gentrification. This section forms part of the Historic Core district of Downtown, together with portions of Hill, Broadway, Main and Los Angeles streets.

Name
Originally named Calle Primavera, Spring Street was renamed in 1849 by city surveyor Edward Ord. He named the street after a woman he was wooing, one whom he'd given the nickname “mi primavera, my springtime”.

Geography

Spring Street consists of 3 sections:
 The original section of Spring Street begins in the south from the intersection of 9th Street. At 7th Street, the Spring Street Financial District begins, ending just after 4th Street. This section of Spring ends at a three-way junction with Cesar Chavez Avenue. 
 One block east of this junction, N. Spring Street continues northeast through Chinatown, terminating at College Street. This section was originally called Calle de la Eternidad (Eternity Street), then Upper Main Street and then by 1897, San Fernando Street.
 One block east of that junction, another portion of North Spring Street continues northeast, at a gradually more easterly angle, crosses the Los Angeles River into Lincoln Heights, and terminates at a junction with North Broadway and Avenue 18. This section originally bore the names San Fernando Street, Olympia Street and Downey Street.

Historic District
The historic district includes 23 financial structures, including the city's first skyscraper, and three hotels all located along a stretch of South Spring Street from just north of Fourth Street to just south of Seventh Street. In the first half of the 20th century, this stretch of Spring Street was the financial center of Los Angeles, with the important banks and financial institutions being concentrated there. At least ten of the buildings in the district were designed in whole or in part by John Parkinson, who designed many of the city's landmark buildings in the early 20th century, including the Los Angeles Memorial Coliseum, Los Angeles City Hall, Bullocks Wilshire, and Union Station. Ten of the buildings in the district have been designated as Historic-Cultural Monuments by the Los Angeles Cultural Heritage Commission.

Due to the large percentage of historic bank and financial buildings that remain intact in the district, the area was listed on the National Register of Historic Places in 1979.  The Los Angeles Conservancy offers walking tours of the Spring Street Financial District on the fourth Saturday of each month at 10 a.m.; the tour lasts approximately 2-1/2 hours and costs $10 for the general public (reduced rate for Conservancy members).

History

Early days
The city's central business district (CBD) in the 1880s and 1890s lay further north near South Spring and Temple Streets.

The street can claim credit as the birthplace of the motion picture business in Los Angeles. In 1898, Thomas Edison filmed a 60-second film titled "South Spring Street Los Angeles California", mounting a giant camera on a wagon to film the bustling action along South Spring Street.

Wall Street of the West
In the early 1900s, the city center began spreading south, and the city's banks and financial institutions began concentrating along South Spring Street.  The first two important buildings to make the move south were the Hellman and Continental Buildings, with the Continental Building being considered the city's first skyscraper. In 1911, the Los Angeles Times boasted about the building boom on Spring Street:

The visitor to this city can at this moment observe skyscrapers in all stages of construction.  It is a study which will provide the most comprehensible kind of answer to the query as to why Los Angeles is leading San Francisco, Portland, Seattle, St. Louis, Pittsburgh, Cleveland, Cincinnati, Baltimore, Detroit, Minneapolis, New Orleans, Boston, Buffalo and all other cities of anything near her in building activity as revealed by the monthly expenditures for construction work.

The building boom along South Spring Street continued into the 1920s as the population and economy of Los Angeles boomed.  South Spring Street remained the city's financial center even after World War II.

Decline (1970s–1980s)
In the 1960s, many of the banks and financial institutions began moving to the western part of the downtown area, along Figueroa Street and Wilshire Boulevard.  By the early 1980s, South Spring Street had become known for "transients who sleep in doorways and urinate on sidewalks."  In 1982, the Los Angeles Times commented on the district's decline from "Wall Street of the West" to a blighted area with empty office buildings lining both sides of the street:"When the banks and law firms moved to the 'Gold Coast' typified by Arco Towers, six blocks to the west, Spring Street plummeted to become a neighborhood of hoodlums, derelicts and winos—a neighborhood of echoing buildings full of absolutely nothing above the ground floor."

Redevelopment and regentrification
Since the early 1980s, South Spring Street has been the subject of numerous redevelopment projects.  In recent years, numerous art galleries have moved into the old financial district, which is now known as Gallery Row.  Many of the old bank buildings have also been converted into upscale lofts.  As wealthier residents have moved into the district's lofts, older residents and artists have complained about the increased rents.  One artist who had lived in the district for years said:

The real problem with downtown lately, Gronk and his friends half-jokingly agreed is 'those people.'  Westsiders.  Trust-fund babies.  New tenants who demand their bohemian pleasures be liberally sweetened with suburban amenities.  Landlords who previously recruited artists to help make downtown 'safe' for gentrification, then jacked up their rents so only lawyers and screenwriters could afford it.

Beaux Arts architecture as the district's enduring strength
The strength of the district remains its period architecture.  Many of the Beaux Arts façades along Spring Street remain virtually intact, making the district a popular shooting location for motion picture and television productions seeking authentic period cityscapes.  In 1985, noted Los Angeles Times columnist Jack Smith pointed to the Spring Street Financial District as proof that "Los Angeles was never the cultural wasteland it was alleged to be."  He hailed the district's "financial palaces" as "a solid architectural achievement" which give the street "beauty, strength, unity and dignity."

Buildings and sites in the district
Notable buildings in the district (from north to south) include:

 Hellman Building  Northeast corner of 4th and Spring – Built in 1902, the Hellman and Continental Buildings were the first major structures to anchor the Spring Street Financial District.  The Hellman Building, now known as Banco Popular, is an eight-story brick and concrete structure designed by Alfred Rosenheim.  In 1998, Gilmore Associates announced plans to convert the Hellman Building, the Continental Building, and the San Fernando Building into 230 lofts. The converted buildings consisted of large, open lofts with high ceilings and no interior walls except for the bathrooms.  The conversion was designed by architect Wade Killefer, who noted: "What lends these buildings to residential use is lots of windows and high ceilings, offering wonderful light."  The combined project became known as the Old Bank District lofts.

 The Continental Building 408 S. Spring Street – Built in 1902, the Continental Building was originally known as the Braly Building.  The 12-story building was designed by John Parkinson and is considered the first "skyscraper" in Los Angeles.  It was the tallest building in Los Angeles until 1907.  It is known for its highly ornamental cornice and bands. The Continental Building was converted into lofts as part of Tom Gilmore's Old Bank District lofts project.  It was designated a Historic Cultural Landmark (HCM #730) in 2002.

 El Dorado Hotel 416 S. Spring Street – Originally known as the Hotel Stowell, the 12-story  hotel was built in 1913 and designed by Frederick Noonan with a highly stylized and brightly colored facade, enameled brick and terra cotta. Batchelder tiles are used extensively in the hotel and lobby.  Shortly after the hotel opened, Charlie Chaplin lived at the Stowell, which he described as "a middle-rate place but new and comfortable."  Chaplin later told a story about receiving a telephone call while there concerning an appearance for which he was to be paid $25,000.  Chaplin recalled: "My bedroom window opened out on the well of the hotel, so that the voice of anyone talking resounded through the rooms. The telephone connection was bad, 'I don't intend to pass up twenty-five thousand dollars for two weeks’ work!' I had to shout several times. A window opened above and a voice shouted back: 'Cut out that bull and go to sleep, you big dope!'"  In 2008, the building was converted into lofts under the name "El Dorado Lofts."

 Title Insurance Building 433 S. Spring Street – Built in 1928, the Title Insurance Building is a ten-story building designed by John and Donald Parkinson in the Zig-Zag Moderne style.  The marble lobby includes a mural by Hugo Ballin.  The Title Insurance Building was the subject of the district's first major redevelopment project.  Architect-developer Ragnar C. Qvale acquired the building in 1979.  He took the impressive Art Deco shell and converted the building into the Design Center of Los Angeles, which he leased to wholesale household furniture showrooms. Early 2011, the ground floor of the building became an art gallery and coffee shop, and took the logical name of Groundfloor Gallery & Café.  The Title Insurance Building was designated a Historic Cultural Landmark (HCM #772) in 2003.

 Crocker Bank 453 S. Spring Street – Built in 1914, the 10-story building was designed by Parkinson and Bergstrom. The building was once the Los Angeles headquarters of Crocker Citizens National Bank.  Now known as the Spring Arts Tower, the building is part of a movement to convert the old financial district into the city's "Gallery Row."  The building's interior features original Art Deco designs, Art Nouveau details, sculptured brass, Italian marble, Batchelder tile, California alder and tiger oak.  The building's tenants include artists, designers, architects, film production companies, and law firms. A nightclub called the "Crocker Club" is scheduled to open on the vault floor in 2008.

 Rowan Building 460 S Spring Street – Built in 1910, the 11-story Rowan Building was originally known as the Chester Building, designed by Parkinson & Bergstrom in a mix of Beaux Arts and Classical styles.  Ornate cast iron rosettes hang from the building's cornice, and elegant glazed terra cotta panels cover the facade.  During its construction, the Times described it as a "mammoth" structure being built with the most massive steel girders and beams ever used on the West CoaStreet  The building, built from 3000 tons of steel, was the largest office in Los Angeles in 1911.  During its construction, hundreds of people lined the street "to see the huge crane swinging these titanic metal units of the structural plan into place for the workmen with the air riveters." Built by developer Robert A. Rowan, the Rowan Building once housed many of the city's prominent law offices and stock brokerage firms. It has been known over the years as the Central Fire Proof Building Company and the Chester Building and has been converted into 206 live/work condominium units with retail space on the ground floor.  Many interior features including Carrara marble corridor walls and floors, mahogany windows, and detailed Art Deco elevator doors have been preserved.

 Alexandria Hotel 210 W. 5th Street – Built in 1906, the eight-story Alexandria Hotel is another building designed by John Parkinson.  With 500 rooms, an elaborate wood lobby, and the glamorous Palm Court with its stained glass dome, the Alexandria was the most luxurious hotel in Los Angeles from the time it opened until the Biltmore opened in the mid-1920s.  Movie stars and other celebrities, including Mae West, Humphrey Bogart, Rudolph Valentino, Clark Gable, Greta Garbo, Sarah Bernhardt, Enrico Caruso and Jack Dempsey were guests.  Charlie Chaplin kept a suite at the Alexandria and did improvisations in the lobby where Tom Mix reportedly rode his horse.  The carpet in the lobby was called the "million-dollar carpet", because there was purportedly a $1 million worth of business done there every day.  It was there that D.W. Griffith, Mary Pickford and Douglas Fairbanks met in 1919 to form United Artists. U.S. Presidents Theodore Roosevelt, William Howard Taft and Woodrow Wilson, and many foreign dignitaries, including King Edward VIII, also stayed at the hotel while visiting Los Angeles.  The hotel declined after the Biltmore opened and closed in 1934, with its chandelier and gold leaf covering of the mezzanine lobby being stripped and sold.  It reopened in 1937 but declined again in the 1950s, become a transient hotel with the Grand Ballroom being used as a training ring for boxers.  Today, the Alexandria has been converted to apartments.  The Palm Court in the Alexandria was designated a Historic Cultural Landmark (HCM #80) in 1971.

 Security Building 510 S. Spring Street – Built in 1906, the 11-story steel-frame Security Building was designed in an Italianate style by Parkinson and Bergstrom. When it was built, it was the tallest building in Los Angeles, surpassing the Continental Building.  It remained the city's tallest building until 1911.  The Security Building has been converted to lofts operated under the name "The Lofts at the Security Building."  The Security Building was designated a Historic Cultural Landmark (HCM #741) in 2003.

 Los Angeles Theater Center 514 S. Spring Street – Built in 1916, the one-story building was designed by John Parkinson in a Greek-Revival style with Ionic columns.  In addition to the columns, the building is known for its lobby with a large 50 by  stained glass ceiling supported by heavy ornamental bronze cornices and marble walls.  It been known over the years as the Security Trust & Savings Building, the Security National Bank Building and the President Trading Company.  In 1985, the building reopened as the Los Angeles Theater Center, a venue with multiple theaters offering live theatrical productions.  The converted building has preserved the bank lobby with its stained glass ceiling.  The Theater Center met with financial trouble and was forced to close.  However, it was later re-opened by the City.

 Spring Arcade Building 541 S. Spring Street – Built in 1924, the 12-story, double-wing Arcade Building, designed by architects Kenneth MacDonald and Maurice Couchot, includes a cavernous midblock arcade connecting Spring Street with Broadway.  Originally known as the "Mercantile Arcade Building," it was modeled on the Burlington Arcade in London, England.  Its three-level, skylighted arcade has been called a space "as regal as almost any other interior space in the city."  The tower on top of the building once supported the antenna of the radio station KRKD ("RKD" = Arcade), from which Aimee Semple McPherson preached her message.  The ups and downs of the district were reflected in the sales of the Arcade Building.  As the area fell into decline, it sold in 1977 for $300,000.  Five years later, as redevelopment projects fueled speculation in Spring Street properties, it sold for $4.5 million—15 times its 1977 sale price. The  building was converted into 142 loft apartments as part of a $15-million renovation.

 Lloyd's Bank 548 S. Spring Street – Built in 1913, the 12-story Lloyd's Bank was designed in the Commercial style by William Curlett & Son.  The building has been converted into lofts and is now known as SB Lofts. The music video of I'll Be Over You was shot with the band, Toto, playing on the rooftop of this building.

 Pacific Southwest Bank NW corner of 6th and Spring – Built in 1910, the 11-story Pacific Southwest Bank was designed by Parkinson & Bergstrom in the Classical style with fluted columns.  The building has been converted into lofts and is now known as SB Manhattan.

 United California Bank 600 S. Spring Street – Built in 1961 and designed by Claud Beelman & Associates, this contemporary glass and concrete building is one of the few nonconforming intrusions in the Spring Street Financial District.  It was the first skyscraper to be built after the city's building height limit was lifted.  City planners hoped it would solidify Spring Street as the city's financial center, but an exodus of banks and financial institutions began in the 1960s.

 Hotel Hayward 601 S. Spring Street – Built in 1905, the nine-story Hotel Hayward was designed by Charles Whittlesey.  There is a 14-story addition on the western side that was added in 1925 and designed by John and Donald Parkinson.  The Hotel Hayward plays a part in the 2007 movie "Transformers," as the climactic battle between "Megatron" and "Optimus Prime" takes place on the street in front of The Hotel Hayward. The hotel was built on the site of the original Ralphs Brothers grocery store, when the area was still south of the central business district and was still mostly residential. That store would give rise to today's large chain of supermarkets.

 Los Angeles Stock Exchange Building 618 S. Spring Street – Built in 1929, the eleven-story exchange building was designed by Samuel Lunden in the Moderne style.  Ground was broken in October 1929, just as the Great Depression hit, and when the Los Angeles Stock Exchange opened its doors there in 1931, the country was deep into the Depression.  There are three bas-relief panels carved by Salvatore Cartaino Scarpitta into the granite above the building's entrance.  The panels portray the elements of a capitalist economy.  The large central panel, "Finance", displays capitalists.  The "Production" panel shows an aircraft engine, a steel worker pouring molten metal and a worker stirring it. The "Research and Discovery" panel shows oil derricks, factories, a chemist conducting an experiment and a man kneeling in a library reading a book. The interior is wonderfully preserved, and has ancient Near East and Native Indian influences by the designer Julian Ellsworth Garnsey. On the entrance lobby's ceiling the Wilson Studio created four sculpted figures representing: Speed (Mercury), Accuracy (the archer), Permanence (a figure contemplating the universe), and Equality (the figure bearing scales). The highlight of the interior was its massive 90' x 74' balconied trading floor with a forty-foot ceiling and sixty-four booths. On fifth floor was a clearing-house with a statistics department, an auditorium, and a lecture room. Offices occupied floors six through nine, and the top two floors included: a club with a library, a card room, a billiard room, and reading rooms. The basement held a 2,660-sq. ft. printing room and a vault. In 1986, the exchange (by then part of the Pacific Stock Exchange) moved out of the building.  In the late 1980s, the Community Redevelopment Agency helped fund a night club that opened in the Exchange Building—called the Stock Exchange, but the club did not survive the 1980s. In late 2008, the building underwent extensive renovations and reopened in 2010 as Exchange LA nightclub.  The visually dynamic building and interiors are frequently used for location filming, and has been featured in The Big Lebowski, The Social Network, and numerous television shows and commercials. Special events include corporate parties, product debuts, and fashion shows. The Stock Exchange Building was designated a Historic Cultural Landmark (HCM #205) in 1979.

 E.F. Hutton Building 623 S. Spring Street – Built in 1931, the 12-story Zig-Zag Moderne E.F. Hutton Building once housed E.F. Hutton's big board.  The Hutton and California Canadian Bank were the first office buildings to be converted into residences.  In 1984, the Community Redevelopment Agency converted the adjacent towers into 121 condominiums in a project called Premiere Towers.  However, when most of the units failed to sell, the agency sold the project to a developer who offered the units for rental—in the process destroying property values for those who had purchased units.

 California Canadian Bank 625 S. Spring Street – Built in 1923, the 12-story Neo-Classical building includes terra cotta ornamentation on the top two levels.  The building is now part of the Premiere Towers project with the E.F. Hutton Building.

 Mortgage Guaranty Building 626 S. Spring Street – Built in 1913, the six-story Mortgage Guaranty Building (also known as the Sassony Building) has a decorative cornice and fluted columns.  In 2004, the structure was converted into 36 apartments called "City Lofts" by developer Izek Shomof.

 Banks & Huntley Building 632 S. Spring Street – Built in 1930, the Banks & Huntley Building was designed by John and Donald Parkinson in the Moderne style.  It is now known as The Nonprofit Center, housing the national and regional offices for MALDEF, a Latino civil rights organization. The building also rents space to other nonprofit organizations providing assistance to minority and underserved communities.  The building has been restored to its original Art Deco design. The Banks & Huntley Building was designated a Historic Cultural Landmark (HCM #631) in 1999.

 Barclays Bank 639 S. Spring Street – Built in 1919, the 13-story Barclays Bank was designed by Morgan, Walls & Morgan.  The Barclays Bank building was designated a Historic Cultural Landmark (HCM #671) in 1999.

 A.G. Bartlett Building 651 S. Spring Street – Built in 1911, the Bartlett Building was originally known as the Union Oil Building and served as the headquarters of Union Oil Company until 1923.  The building was designed by Parkinson & Bergstrom.  It was also the place where Southwestern Law School got its start in 1911 with a few young men meeting three nights a week to study law with a tutor.

 Bank of America Building 650 S. Spring Street – Built in 1924, the 12-story Bank of America Building was designed by Schultze & Weaver.  Its facade has Indian limestone and terra cotta in a style reminiscent of Louis Sullivan. The building has been converted into lofts and is now known as SB Spring.

 Financial Center Building 704 S. Spring Street – Built in 1923, the 13-story Financial Center Building was designed by S. Tilden Norton and Frederick Wallis.  The facade has pressed brick and terra cotta.

 I.N. Van Nuys Building 210 W. 7th Street – Built in 1911 by the Isaac Newton Van Nuys (a noted banker and owner of much of the San Fernando Valley), the Van Nuys Building is an 11-story building in Classical style with Italianate details.  The Times reported in 1911 that the magnificent new building would be "the city's most expensive office building" at $1,250,000.  In the early 1980s, City redevelopment agencies spent $24.3 million to convert the Van Nuys Building into 299 units of housing for senior citizens and the handicapped.  The Van Nuys Building was designated a Historic Cultural Landmark (HCM #898) in 2007.

 National City Bank of Los Angeles building

Just south of the Historic District but included here for convenience. Built in 1924, the 12-story Beaux-Arts building at 810 S. Spring St. (southeast corner of 8th St.) was designed by Walker & Eisen as the headquarters of National City Bank of Los Angeles, and was designated a Historic Cultural Landmark (HCM #871) in 2007. It was converted from offices to 93 residential units plus retail space in 2008, and was renamed the National City Tower.

Image gallery

Downtown north of the historic district
North of the historic district, Spring Street passes through the Civic Center district along government buildings built since the 1920s. However, this area was the heart of the city's business district around the 1880s and 1890s, nearly all of which was demolished.

See also

List of Registered Historic Places in Los Angeles
International Savings & Exchange Bank Building, (1907) at 227 N. Spring Street (now demolished)

References

External links

Spring Street National Register Nomination Text
A Visit to Old Los Angeles: Spring Street, part 1
A Visit to Old Los Angeles: Spring Street, part 2

National Register of Historic Places in Los Angeles
Historic districts in Los Angeles
History of banking in the United States
Districts of Downtown Los Angeles
Historic districts on the National Register of Historic Places in California
Spring Street (Los Angeles)